The 2020 FC Shakhter Karagandy season was the 30th successive season that the club played in the Kazakhstan Premier League, the highest tier of association football in Kazakhstan. Shakhter Karagandy finished the season in 4th position and as a result qualified for the 2021–22 UEFA Europa Conference League.

Season Events
On 13 March, the Football Federation of Kazakhstan announced all league fixtures would be played behind closed doors for the foreseeable future due to the COVID-19 pandemic.

On 17 June Vyacheslav Hroznyi his role as manager by mutual consent, with Konstantin Gorovenka being appointed as his replacement the following day.

On 26 June, it was announced that the league would resume on 1 July, with no fans being permitted to watch the games. The league was suspended for a second time on 3 July, for an initial two weeks, due to an increase in COVID-19 cases in the country.

New Contracts
On 24 January, Shakhter Karagandy extended their contract with Jean-Ali Payruz.

On 8 February, Yerkebulan Nurgaliyev and Gevorg Najaryan signed new contracts with Shakhter Karagandy. On 16 March the Football Federation of Kazakhstan suspended all football until 15 April.

Transfers
On 21 July, Shakhter Karagandy announced the signing of Erkin Tapalov from Caspiy. Five days later, 26 July, Aydos Tattybaev also joined Shakhter Karagandy from Caspiy.

On 6 August, Shakhter Karagandy announced the signing of Ruslan Mingazow, with Soslan Takulov joining from Slutsk on 9 August.

Squad

On loan

Transfers

In

Out

Loans out

Released

Trial

Friendlies

Competitions

Premier League

Results summary

Results by round

Results

League table

Kazakhstan Cup

Squad statistics

Appearances and goals

|-
|colspan="14"|Players away from Shakhter Karagandy on loan:
|-
|colspan="14"|Players who left Shakhter Karagandy during the season:

|}

Goal scorers

Clean sheet

Disciplinary record

References

External links
Official Website

FC Shakhter Karagandy seasons
Shakhter Karagandy